Pehlavan bey Bayandur was ruler of Aq Qoyunlu tribal union.

Life 
He was a son of Idris bey Bayandur. For the first time during his reign, Bayandur eli settled in Diyarbakir region. According to Kitab-i Diyarbakriyya, the Bayandur people captured the fortress of Alinja Tower during his reign and defeated several Mongol commanders. He was the father of Aladdin Turali Bey.

He died in 1340. After his death, his son Turali Bey succeeded him and remained in power until 1362.

References

Aq Qoyunlu rulers
14th-century births
1340 deaths
Year of birth unknown
14th-century monarchs in the Middle East
Azerbaijani nobility